The Daet Cathedral, also known as the Cathedral of the Most Holy Trinity, is a prominent Latin Rite Roman Catholic cathedral located in Daet, Camarines Norte, Philippines. It was erected in 1984 after the Diocese of Daet was created by a Papal Bull on May 27, 1974.  the rector is the Most Reverend Gilbert Armea Garcera.

History
The construction of the parish church took a long time of preparation. It started long before Camarines Norte became a diocese. During the incumbency of Msgr. Antonino O. Reganit as parish priest of Daet, the cathedral compound was acquired from the Magana Family. Construction of a complex building was started, the center of which was the proposed main altar. Reganit died before completion.

September 1, 1974 was the canonical erection day of the diocese, with the ordination and installation of the first bishop, Celestino R. Enverga. Enverga completed construction, with modifications, and launched other infrastructure projects: the bishop's residence with the annexed parish house, the cathedral, the Carillon Multi-purpose hall, the library, museum and printing house, the Blessed Sacrament Chapel, the Kolbe's House (now the Holy Trinity Cathedral Rectory Office), the Bishop Enverga Hall, the concrete fencing of the compound with guard-house in the two gates, and the stand-by power house.

The cathedral church was consecrated on September 1, 1984, on the first decade celebration of the diocese. It was dedicated to the Most Holy Trinity by Jose T. Sanchez, Archbishop of Nueva Segovia, with Wilfredo D. Manlapaz as preacher and Pablo Balon as rector.

On November 2, 1995, a strong typhoon destroyed the cathedral's roof and a series of typhoons damaged the church again in the year 2005.

List of recent Rectors
Rev. Fr. Luis M. Puno, Jr. (2006–2008)
Rev. Fr. Joselito M. Quiñones (2008–2009)
Most Rev. Gilbert Garcera, D.D. (2009–2017)
Most Rev. Rex Andrew Alarcon, D.D. (2019-Present)

References

Roman Catholic churches in Camarines Norte
Roman Catholic cathedrals in the Philippines
Churches in the Roman Catholic Diocese of Daet